Mamlah may refer to:
 Shahrak-e Mamlah - town of Mamlah, Ilam Province
 Mamlah-ye Olya - upper Mamlah, Khuzestan Province